The General Electric (GE) 289A Boxcabs were a series of electric locomotives built by General Electric during the 1920s which operated in Chile on the Sociedad Química y Minera until the railroad was closed down in 2015 following severe weather damage.

They ran on  gauge track and were powered through overhead wires running at 1.5 kV DC power.

Locomotives of this type are still in use in the 21st Century . and as of 2009, the railroad operated still operated seven locomotives of this type.  

The builder’s plate attached to the locomotives in Chile gives the following technical details on the units: Class B-B -134/134-E-4GE289A, operating on 1500 V DC power, built at the GE plant in Schenectady, New York, USA.

Gallery

References

General Electric locomotives
Bo-Bo locomotives
1500 V DC locomotives